Harptree could refer to

 East Harptree or West Harptree, two villages in Somerset, England
 Harptree Combe, a wooded valley nearby
 Baron Dean of Harptree, a British peer
 Harptree, Saskatchewan